Donna Faber (born July 5, 1971) is a former professional tennis player. She competed in Grand Slam tournaments from 1988 to 1993.

WTA Tour finals

Singles 2 (0–2)

References

External links
 
 

1971 births
Living people
American female tennis players
Tennis players at the 1991 Pan American Games
Pan American Games medalists in tennis
Place of birth missing (living people)
Pan American Games gold medalists for the United States
Medalists at the 1991 Pan American Games
21st-century American women